Shammaila (Arabic/Persian/Urdu:شمائلہ) (IPA:ʃʊmaːʔɪləh) is an Arabic female name. Notable people with this name include:

 Shumaila Mushtaq, Pakistani cricketer
 Shumaila Qureshi, Pakistani cricketer

Arabic feminine given names